Sergey Sergeyevich Voynov (born February 26, 1977) is an Uzbek athlete who competes in the javelin throw. His personal best throw is 84.80 metres, achieved in 2000.

Achievements

1999 Central Asian Games - gold medal
1997 Central Asian Games - gold medal

Seasonal bests by year
1994 - 72.74
1996 - 81.80
1997 - 78.04
1998 - 79.70
1999 - 83.12
2000 - 84.80
2001 - 82.71
2002 - 81.25
2003 - 79.06
2004 - 78.36
2005 - 76.12
2006 - 71.34

External links

sports-reference

1977 births
Living people
Uzbekistani male javelin throwers
Athletes (track and field) at the 1996 Summer Olympics
Athletes (track and field) at the 2000 Summer Olympics
Athletes (track and field) at the 2004 Summer Olympics
Olympic athletes of Uzbekistan
Asian Games medalists in athletics (track and field)
Athletes (track and field) at the 1998 Asian Games
Athletes (track and field) at the 2002 Asian Games
Athletes (track and field) at the 2006 Asian Games
Uzbekistani people of Russian descent
Asian Games gold medalists for Uzbekistan
Asian Games bronze medalists for Uzbekistan
World Athletics Championships athletes for Uzbekistan
Medalists at the 1998 Asian Games
Medalists at the 2002 Asian Games
Competitors at the 1995 Summer Universiade
20th-century Uzbekistani people